Gandhari plays a prominent role in the Hindu epic the Mahabharata. She was a princess of Gandhara and the wife of Dhritrashtra, the blind king of Hastinapura, and the mother of a hundred sons, the Kauravas, and a daughter. She is usually depicted with a blindfold, which she wore in order to live like her husband.

She is also the sister in law of former king Pandu and his wife queen Kunti.

Early life and marriage
Gandhari was born to Subala, the ruler of Gandhara. As a maiden, Gandhari was noted for her piety and virtuous nature. Gandhari is regarded as an incarnation of the goddess Mati. She was the sister of Shakuni.

During her maiden days, she is said to have impressed Shiva through penance and received a boon to bear 100 children. However, the reason for her penance and her receiving such boon is unknown. In alternative versions, she is said to have impressed Veda Vyasa with her gracious and generous nature. One of the main reasons of Bhishma choosing Gandhari to be the elder daughter-in-law of the Kuru kingdom is said to be this boon, which would put an end to his worry of the throne remaining vacant.

Gandhari's marriage was arranged with Dhritarashtra, the eldest prince of the Kuru kingdom. The Mahabharata depicted her as a beautiful and virtuous woman as well as a very dedicated wife. Their marriage was arranged by Bhishma. When she found out that her would-be husband was born blind, she decided to blindfold herself in order to emulate her husband's experiences. It is stated that the act of blindfolding herself was a sign of dedication and love. On the contrary, Irawati Karve and many modern scholars have debated that the act of blindfolding was an act of protest against Bhishma, as he intimidated her father into giving away her hand in marriage to the blind prince of Hastinapura.

The Mahabharata depicts her marriage as a major reason for the story's central conflict. However in Vyasa's Mahabharata, there is no mention of Shakuni objecting to Gandhari's marriage with Dhritarashtra. As per the Adi Parva of the Mahabharata, Shakuni brought her sister Gandhari to Hastinapura for marriage. Gandhari was welcomed well by the Kuru elders and Shakuni gave many gifts to Hastinapura and returned to his kingdom.

Her husband Dhritarashtra was denied the throne because of his blindness, despite being the eldest son. The throne went to Pandu, the younger brother of Dhritarashtra. After being cursed by Sage Kindama, Pandu renounced his kingdom in order to repent. With this turn of events, her husband was crowned King of Hastinapura and she became his queen.

Pregnancy and birth of her children 

Once, an exhausted Veda Vyasa came to Gandhari's palace. Vyasa was impressed by Gandhari's hospitality and gave her a boon which she desired that "she should have century of sons each equal unto her lord in strength and accomplishments". She became pregnant but carried the child for an unusual long period of two years. Later, when she heard that Kunti (queen of king Pandu, younger brother of Dhritarashtra) had given birth to the eldest of the Pandavas, she strucked on her stomach in frustration only to result in the birth of a "hard mass of flesh" like an "iron ball,” not a child.

Just as she was about to throw away the mass of flesh, Veda Vyasa arrived (knowing every occurrence with his spiritual power). Before Vyasa, she admitted her jealousy of Kunti and complained about the boon he had given her. Veda Vyasa assured her that he had never spoken "untruth" and ordered that a "hundred pots full of clarified butter be brought instantly, and let them be placed at a concealed spot. In the meantime, let cool water be sprinkled over this ball of flesh". During this process, Gandhari professed her wish of having a daughter to the ascetic; the daughter, Dushala, would be youngest of her all children. The lump of flesh was originally cut into one hundred parts, but when Gandhari revealed she wanted a daughter the mass was cut once more to make one hundred and one parts. Then, Vyasa "brought another pot full of clarified butter, and put the part intended for a daughter into it." These cuts of flesh "sprinkled over with water" developed to become a hundred and one children; from which after two years, her hundred sons and only daughter were born in a month.

After the birth of her first son Duryodhana, many ill omens occurred: the child "began to cry and bray like an ass” and caused "violent winds" and "fires in various directions." A frightened Dhritarashtra summoned Vidura, Bhishma and all other Kurus and countless Brahmanas regarding his firstborn's possibility of succession to the throne. Observing ill omens, Vidura and the other brahmanas suggested the king forsake his first born, since the child might cause destruction to the Kuru clan, but out of paternal love for his first child he ignored the advice.

Later life and death 

After the Mahabharata War, Gandhari cursed Krishna that his clan, the Yadavas, would perish the way her children perished. Krishna accepted the curse and it came true 36 years after the war, when the Yadavas were drinking and enjoying life. They started teasing rishis, who cursed Krishna's son into birthing an iron club. The iron club was broken down, thrown in the ocean, but found its way back onto land and into the weapons that destroyed every member of the clan— including Krishna.

It is believed that Gandhari made a single purposeful exception to her blindfolded state, when she removed her blindfold to see her eldest son Duryodhana. She poured all her power into her son's body in one glance, rendering Duryodhana's entire body, except his loins, as strong as a thunderbolt. Krishna foiled Gandhari's plan by asking Duryodhana to cover up his private part before meeting his mother. On their decisive encounter on the eighteenth day of the Kurukshetra battle, Bhima smashed Duryodhana's thighs, a move both literally and figuratively below the belt. Despite its popularity the story is not mentioned in the original version of the Mahabharata written by Veda Vyasa. As per Vyasa's Mahabharata, Duryodhana, while fighting against Bhima, displayed his superior mace skills, due to which Bhima could not defeat him and had to break rules to kill him.

All of Gandhari's sons were killed in the war against their cousins, the Pandavas, at Kurukshetra, specifically at the hands of Bhima. Upon hearing the news, it is said that through a small gap in the blindfold, her gaze fell on Yudhishthira's toe. His clean toe was charred black due to her wrath and power. When she heard the news of the death of all the sons of Pandavas (Upapandavas), she embraced the Pandavas and consoled them for their losses. Later her wrath turned to Krishna for allowing all this destruction to happen. She cursed that he, his city and all his subjects would be destroyed. Krishna accepted the curse. Her curse took its course 36 years after the great war when Yadu dynasty perished after a fight broke out between Yadavas at a festival. Krishna ascended to his heavenly abode after living for 126 years. The golden city of Dvaraka drowned exactly seven days after his disappearance. Gandhari along with her husband Dhritarashtra, brother-in-law Vidura and sister-in-law Kunti, left Hastinapur about 15 years after the war to seek penance. She is said to have died in the Himalayas in a forest fire along with Dhritarastra, Vidura and Kunti and attained moksha.

Portrayal in the Mahabharata

The Mahabharata attributes high moral standards to Gandhari, although her sons are portrayed as villains. She repeatedly exhorted her sons to follow dharma and make peace with the Pandavas. Gandhari fostered a big-little sister relationship with Kunti. Famously, when Duryodhana would ask for her blessing of victory during the Kurukshetra war, Gandhari would only say "may victory find the side of righteousness". Gandhari's major flaw was her love for her sons, especially her first born, Duryodhana, which often blinded her to his flaws.

Legacy

In Hebbya village, Nanjangud, Mysore, India there is a temple called Gāndhārī temple  dedicated to her. This temple honours her devotion and loyalty as she epitomized the goodness of a mother and a loving wife. The foundation stone of the temple was laid on June 19, 2008.

Rabindranath Tagore wrote a Bengali poetic play about her, named Gandharir Abedon (Bangla: গান্ধারীর আবেদন, Translation: Supplication of Gandhari). Gandhari, her husband Dhritarashtra and their son Duryodhana are central characters in the play. Aditi Banerjee wrote a novel named The Curse of Gandhari, which depicts the story of the Mahabharata through the perspective of Gandhari.

In media and television
In B.R.Chopra's Mahabharat Gandhari was portrayed by Renuka Israni
In Ramanand Sagar's Shri Krishna Gandhari was portrayed by Neela Patel
In Star Plus's Mahabharat  Gandhari was portrayed by Riya Deepsi|Riya Deepsi
In Mahabharatham Gandhari was portrayed by Pavithra Janani
In Dharmakshetra (2014) Gandhari was portrayed by Maleeka R. Ghai
In Suryaputra Karna (2015 TV Series) Gandhari was portrayed by Smriti Sinha Vatsa
In Radhakrishn (2018–present) Gandhari was portrayed by Via Roy Choudhury

References

External links 

 
 

Ancient Indian women
Characters in the Mahabharata
Hinduism in Afghanistan
Indian queen consorts
People related to Krishna